Georgi Gugava (born 10 November 1978) is a Georgian judoka.

Achievements

References

1978 births
Living people
Male judoka from Georgia (country)
Judoka at the 2000 Summer Olympics
Olympic judoka of Georgia (country)
Place of birth missing (living people)